The World Figure Skating Championships is an annual figure skating competition sanctioned by the International Skating Union in which figure skaters compete for the title of World Champion.

Men's and ladies' competitions were held on January 25–26 in Troppau, Austria-Hungary (modern-day Opava, Czech Republic). Pairs' competition took place on February 16 in Saint Petersburg, Russian Empire. It was the first World Championships in which pair skating was contested.

Results

Men

Judges:
 Otto Bohatsch 
 C. Dorasil 
 P. Engelhardt 
 H. D. Faith 
 I. Forssling 
 Gustav Hügel 
 Otto Schöning

Ladies

Judges:
 H. D. Faith 
 Otto Schöning 
 I. Forssling 
 Gustav Hügel 
 P. Engelhardt

Pairs

Judges:
 Rudolf Sundgren 
 V. Shnobel 
 J. Kettnitz 
 A. Ivashenztsov 
 Viacheslav Sresnevsky

Sources
 Result List provided by the ISU

World Figure Skating Championships
World Figure Skating Championships, 1908
International figure skating competitions hosted by Austria-Hungary
International figure skating competitions hosted by Russia
1908 in Austria-Hungary
1908 in the Russian Empire
Sports competitions in Saint Petersburg
1900s in Saint Petersburg
January 1908 sports events
February 1908 sports events